The Golden Bell Award for Most Popular Drama Series is a popular vote award presented at the annual Golden Bell Awards. It was introduced in 2022.

Winners

2020s

References

Popular Drama Series, Most
Golden Bell Awards, Most Popular Drama Series